Nuno Alvites, also referred to as Nuno or Nuño Aloitiz (fl. 10171028), was a count of Portugal, a descendant of the first count, Vímara Peres as the son of Count Alvito Nunes and Gontina.

His presence is recorded for the first time in 1017. He appears in 1025 confirming a donation made by King Alfonso V of León to Nuno's brother, Pedro Alvites and again in that same year in another charter in which he states that he succeeded his father Alvito. He ruled the county with his spouse Ilduara Mendes, daughter of earlier count Menendo González, until he was assassinated in 1028, the same year as the death of King Alfonso V. Ilduara continued to rule the county, with her son Mendo, who was still a child, as regent after her husband's death.

Marriage and issue 
 Mendo Nunes (or Menendo Núñez), (fl. 10281050/1053). He governed the country probably as a minor under the regency of his mother and alone as of 1043.
 Gontroda Núñez, whose presence is recorded in medieval sources from 1028 until 1088, was married to Count Vasco. They were the parents of at least one child, count Nuño Velázquez, known in Portuguese sources as Nuno Vasques or Nuno of Celanova. Nuño married Fronilde Sánchez and had several children, including counts Alfonso, Menendo, and Sancho Núñez.
 Munio Nunes, who sold a property in Domez before 1031.

Notes

References

Bibliography 

 
 
 
 
 
 

11th-century counts of Portugal (Asturias-León)
County of Portugal